Film locations in Sonoma County, California are a diverse set of sites throughout this California county, where all or parts of notable motion pictures have been produced.   Due to the scenic and varied aspects of Sonoma County, a large number of films have been made within this County.  Some of the earliest U.S. filmmaking occurred in Sonoma County such as the 1914 production 1914 Salomy Jane and Bronco Billy Anderson produced in 1915.  Many of these films are classics in American cinematography such as the 1947 film The Farmer's Daughter, starring Joseph Cotten and Loretta Young, and Alfred Hitchcock's The Birds produced in 1963, which was also partially filmed in adjacent Marin County.  Many other more modern classics have used Sonoma County as a filming venue, including the 1990 production of the Flatliners and the 1992 film Basic Instinct.  A few of the other representative films produced partially in Sonoma County are:

Representative film locations

See also
Film locations in Santa Rosa, California

References

Culture in the San Francisco Bay Area
Tourist attractions in Sonoma County, California
Cinema of the San Francisco Bay Area